Konstantin Kravchuk defeated Marcel Granollers 1–6, 6–3, 6–2 in the final.

Seeds

Draw

Finals

Top half

Bottom half

References
 Main Draw
 Qualifying Draw

Yugra Cup - Singles
Yugra Cup
2009 in Russian tennis